The Chronicle may refer to:

Publications
 Krónika, Hungarian-language Romanian newspaper
 The Chronicle (Willimantic), Connecticut, U.S.
 The Chronicle (Barton, Vermont), U.S.
 The Chronicle (Centralia, Washington), U.S.
 The Chronicle (Dominica)
 The Chronicle (Duke University), Durham, North Carolina, U.S.
 The Chronicle (Newcastle), England
 The Chronicle (North Central College), Naperville, Illinois, U.S.
 The Chronicle (St. Helens), Oregon, U.S.
 The Chronicle (Two Rivers), Wisconsin, U.S.
 The Chronicle (South Australia)
 The Chronicle (Zimbabwe)
 The Augusta Chronicle, Georgia, U.S.
 The Austin Chronicle, Texas, U.S.
 the Creswell Chronicle, Oregon, U.S.
 the Houston Chronicle, Texas, U.S.
 the San Francisco Chronicle, California, U.S.
 The Toowoomba Chronicle, Queensland, Australia
 The Chronicle of Higher Education
 The Chronicle of Philanthropy

Other uses
 The Chronicle (TV series), 2001–02 American science fiction television series
 "The Chronicle" (Seinfeld), ninth-season episode of the American sitcom Seinfeld
 The Chronicles (E.S.G. album), 2008 hip hop compilation album

See also
 Chronicle (disambiguation)
 Evening Chronicle (disambiguation)
 The Chronicle-Journal, Thunder Bay, Ontario, Canada

Lists of newspapers